Chromodoris joshi is a species of sea slug. It is a dorid nudibranch, a shell-less marine gastropod mollusc in the family Chromodorididae.

Distribution 
Chromodoris joshi can be found in the Philippines, Sumatra, the Andaman Sea, and Indonesia.

Description
Reaching 60 mm in length, Chromodoris joshi is yellow with three black stripes on its mantle. The marginal band fades from dark golden yellow at the edge, to a buttery yellow. It is covered with white flecks. The rhinophores and gills are a pumpkin orange.

References

External links
 

Chromodorididae
Molluscs of the Indian Ocean
Molluscs of the Pacific Ocean
Gastropods described in 1998